Phan Phiphop Lila Bridge ('King's Cross Bridge') is a bridge across Khlong Khu Mueang Doem, or old moat, in Phra Nakhon District, Bangkok. The bridge connects Thanon Ratchadamnoen Nai (Inner Ratchadamnoen Road) with Thanon Ratchadamnoen Klang (Central Ratchadamnoen Road).

Following the construction of Makkhawan Rangsan Bridge ('Bridge by the God Indra') in 1809, the construction of Phan Phiphop Lila Bridge began in 1902 at the command of King Chulalongkorn who desired to have an elegant bridge connected with the newly built Thanon Ratchadamnoen Nai. Construction was completed in 1906. King Chulalongkorn presided over the opening ceremony on 15 November 1906, at which time the name "Phan Phiphop Lila" was also declared.

The bridge was originally decorated with attractive wrought iron railings, but these were moved when the bridge was enlarged in 1941 to a pedestrian bridge crossing the northern part of Khlong Khu Mueang Doem and located close to the intersection of Chakrabongse Road (Thai: ถนนจักรพงษ์) and Chao Fa Road (Thai: ถนนเจ้าฟ้า). 

Phan Phiphop Lila Bridge has a sister bridge, Phan Fa Lilat Bridge ('King's Cross Bridge'.)

See also 
 Phan Fa Lilat Bridge
 Makkhawan Rangsan Bridge
 Chalerm Sawan 58 Bridge
 Phra Pin-klao Bridge

Notes 

 The northern part of "Khlong Khu Mueang Doem" was formerly known as "Khlong Rongmai". "Khlong Khu Mueang Doem" is also called popularly "Khlong Lord".
 Both the names "Phan Phiphop Lila" and "Phan Fa Lilat" mean a 'king's cross', 'king's walk', or 'king's movement'. But, literally, "Phan Phiphop Lila" means '[the bridge on which] the Ruler of the Universe gracefully walks' and "Phan Fa Lilat" means '[the bridge on which] the Lord of Heaven majestically walks'.

References

External links
 Historical pictures and history of the Phanphiphop Lila Bridge (in Thai): http://www.resource.lib.su.ac.th/rattanakosin/index.php?option=com_content&view=article&id=181

Road bridges in Bangkok
Bridges completed in 1906
Registered ancient monuments in Bangkok
1906 establishments in Siam